The 2018 Utah House of Representatives election was held in the U.S. state of Utah on November 6, 2018, to elect members to the House of Representatives of the 63rd Utah State Legislature. A primary election was held in several districts on June 26, 2018. The election coincided with the election for U.S. Senate and other elections.

The Utah Republican Party won a majority of seats, keeping the Republican majority that they have held since 1977. The new legislature convened on January 28, 2019.

Background 
Republicans have held the Utah State House of Representative since 1977, and the chamber was not considered competitive in 2018. However, as was the case in many states, Democrats were encouraged to see the purported "Blue Wave" come to the Utah State House.

Electoral System 
The 75 members of the House of Representatives were elected from single-member districts by first-past-the-post voting to two-year terms. Contested nominations of the Democratic and Republican parties for each district were determined by an open primary election. Minor-party and independent candidates were nominated by petition. Write-in candidates had to file a request with the secretary of state's office for votes for them to be counted.

Results 
Of the seventy-five seats, Republican candidates won fifty-nine and Democratic candidates won sixteen.

District 1

District 2

District 3

District 4

District 5

District 6

District 7

District 8

District 9

District 10

District 11

District 12

District 13

District 14

District 15

District 16

District 17

District 18

District 19

District 20

District 21

District 22

District 23

District 24

District 25

District 26

District 27

District 28

District 29

District 30

District 31

District 32

District 33

District 34

District 35

District 36

District 37

District 38

District 39

District 40

District 41

District 42

District 43

District 44

District 45

District 46

District 47

District 48

District 49

District 50

District 51

District 52

District 53

District 54

District 55

District 56

District 57

District 58

District 59

District 60

District 61

District 62

District 63

District 64

District 65

District 66

District 67

District 68

District 69

District 70

District 71

District 72

District 73

District 74

District 75

References 

House
Utah House
Utah House of Representatives elections